Lisa Schmidla (born 5 June 1991, in Krefeld) is a German rower. She won a total of three gold medals at the World U23 Championships. At the 2016 Summer Olympics in Rio de Janeiro, she competed in women's quadruple sculls competition in which the German team won the gold medal.

References

External links
 

1991 births
Living people
German female rowers
Sportspeople from Krefeld
Olympic gold medalists for Germany
Olympic rowers of Germany
Rowers at the 2016 Summer Olympics
Olympic medalists in rowing
Medalists at the 2016 Summer Olympics
World Rowing Championships medalists for Germany